Yeni Abdinli is a village and municipality in the Yardymli Rayon of Azerbaijan. It has a population of 366.  The municipality consists of the villages of Yeni Abdinli, Abdinli, and Xanbulaq.

References

Populated places in Yardimli District